The Michigan Solicitor General or Solicitor General of Michigan is the top appellate lawyer for the State of Michigan. It is an appointed position in the Office of the Michigan Attorney General, with supervision over all of the office's  major appellate cases and amici briefs. The majority of the matters that the Solicitor General handles are argued in the United States Supreme Court and the Michigan Supreme Court, although the Solicitor General is also responsible for Michigan's filings in the United States Court of Appeals for the Sixth Circuit, Michigan's appellate courts, and other federal and state appellate courts. On January 15, 2019, Michigan Attorney General Dana Nessel named Fadwa A. Hammoud Michigan Solicitor General.

Creation 
The office of Michigan Solicitor General was created in 1939 and is modeled after the United States Solicitor General. The position is codified in Michigan Compiled Laws Section 14.28.

List of Solicitors 
The current Michigan Solicitor General is Fadwa A. Hammoud.

References

External links
Michigan Attorney General (official site)
Michigan Solicitor General (official site) 

 
Government of Michigan
Michigan law
1939 establishments in Michigan